Nusalala is a genus of brown lacewings. The scientific name was published in 1913 by Longinos Navás. They belong to the subfamily Microminae, as well as the genera Micromus and Megalomina.
Some species of this genus, such as Nusalala brachyptera , are "brachypter" meaning short wings, and have lost the ability to fly; they can only jump. This phenomenon has evolved in a number of genera in the family Hemerobiidae

This genus have an exclusive neotropical distribution (South America, Central America and the Caribbean). As well, the distribution is limited in the South Cone and steppes, where its humidity and temperature conditions may not be enough, and in rain forests, despite their tropical nature.

Species
Nusalala andina Penny & Sturm, 1984
Nusalala brachyptera Oswald, 1997
Nusalala camposina Navás, 1929
Nusalala championi Kimmins, 1936
Nusalala colombiensis Banks, 1910
Nusalala cubana Hagen, 1886
Nusalala dispar Banks, 1910
Nusalala erecta Navás, 1913
Nusalala ghioi Monserrat, 2000
Nusalala ilusionata Monserrat, 2004
Nusalala irrebita Navás, 1929
Nusalala marginata Navás, 1926
Nusalala marini Monserrat, 2000
Nusalala navasi Kimmins, 1936
Nusalala neotropica Esben-Petersen, 1914
Nusalala payasi Monserrat, 2000
Nusalala tessellata Gerstaecker, 1888
Nusalala uncata Kimmins, 1936
Nusalala unguicaudata Monserrat, 2000

References 

Hemerobiiformia